The fourth season of Fargo, an American anthology black comedy–crime drama television series created by Noah Hawley, premiered on September 27, 2020, on FX and concluded on November 29, 2020. It consisted of 11 episodes. Set in Kansas City, Missouri from November 1950 to early 1951, the season follows two crime syndicates as they vie for control of the underground. The cast is led by Chris Rock, who plays Loy Cannon, the head of a crime syndicate made up of black migrants fleeing the Jim Crow South who have a contentious relationship with the Italian Kansas City mafia. Other cast members include Jessie Buckley, Jason Schwartzman, Ben Whishaw, and Jack Huston.

As an anthology, each Fargo season possesses its own self-contained narrative, following a disparate set of characters in various settings and eras, albeit in a connected shared universe centered around Minnesota. The broader Midwestern United States features prominently and some connection to the titular city of Fargo, North Dakota runs through the series. The season was originally scheduled to premiere on April 19, 2020, but this was postponed due to the COVID-19 pandemic.

Cast

Main

 Chris Rock as Loy Cannon, the leader of the African-American crime syndicate Cannon Limited, as well as a businessman trying to get his new idea, the credit card, off the ground.
 Jessie Buckley as Oraetta Mayflower, a deceptively cheerful nurse.
 Jason Schwartzman as Josto Fadda, the physically unimposing and impulsive leader of the Sardinian Fadda family.
 Ben Whishaw as Patrick "Rabbi" Milligan, an Irish-American member of the Fadda family.
 Jack Huston as Odis Weff, a cop with many nervous tics who served in World War II and is secretly on the Faddas' payroll.
 Salvatore Esposito as Gaetano Fadda, Josto's younger but larger brother, a violent and unblinking former Blackshirt from Italy.
 E'myri Crutchfield as Ethelrida Pearl Smutny, an intelligent and rebellious African-American teen.
 Andrew Bird as Thurman Smutny, Ethelrida's father, the owner of a funeral home.
 Anji White as Dibrell Smutny, Ethelrida's stern, protective mother.
 Jeremie Harris as Leon Bittle, a young and ambitious member of the Cannon Limited.
 Matthew Elam as Lemuel Cannon, Loy's elder son.
 Corey Hendrix as Omie Sparkman, a former boxer and a member of the Cannon Limited.
 James Vincent Meredith as Opal Rackley, a member of the Cannon Limited.
 Francesco Acquaroli as Ebal Violante, consigliere of the Fadda family.
  as Constant Calamita, a hitman for the Fadda family.
 Stephen Spencer as Dr. David Harvard, the prejudiced head of a top private hospital in Kansas City.
 Karen Aldridge as Zelmare Roulette, Dibrell's sister, a bank robber.

Recurring

Guests
 Bokeem Woodbine and Brad Mann reprise their respective roles as Mike Milligan and Gale Kitchen in a cameo appearance in the season finale.

Episodes

Production
The fourth season was announced in August 2018 and it was confirmed that Chris Rock was cast in the lead role. In July 2019, 12 actors were announced to have been cast, including Francesco Acquaroli, Andrew Bird, Jessie Buckley, Salvatore Esposito, Jeremie Harris, Jack Huston, Amber Midthunder, Jason Schwartzman, and Ben Whishaw. Midthunder ultimately did not appear and her role was recast with Kelsey Asbille for undisclosed reasons. In September 2019, it was announced that Uzo Aduba had been cast in the role of Zelmare Roulette, however, Aduba had to drop out of the role due to "some personal family issues". The role was recast with Karen Aldridge in December.

Production began in October 2019 in Chicago, Illinois, with Hawley directing the first block of episodes. In March 2020, FX suspended production on the series for at least two weeks due to the COVID-19 pandemic. The original premiere date of April 19, 2020, was also pushed back due to production delays. The series completed production on eight of the eleven episodes before production shut down. Production resumed in August 2020 and was completed by September 8, 2020.

Reception

Critical response
The fourth season has received generally positive reviews from critics, though less acclaimed than previous seasons. On Rotten Tomatoes, the season is "certified fresh" with an 82% critic approval rating and an average score of 7.21 out of 10 based on 51 reviews. The website's critical consensus is, "Though Fargos ambitious fourth season struggles to maintain momentum, fine performances and a change of scenery make for an engaging – if uneven – departure from the series' norm." On Metacritic, it has a score of 68 out of 100 based on 33 reviews, indicating "generally favorable reviews."

Matt Zoller Seitz, writing for Vulture, gave the season a negative review. He criticized the writers' missed opportunity to link the season's unique premise of children swapping among gangs to its themes of immigration and culture, as well as their tendency to make subtext obvious through excessive monologues.

Accolades
For the 11th Critics' Choice Television Awards, Chris Rock received a nomination for Best Actor in a Limited Series and Glynn Turman received a nomination for Best Supporting Actor in a Limited Series.

References

External links

2020 American television seasons
Patricide in fiction
Television productions postponed due to the COVID-19 pandemic
Television series set in the 1950s
Television shows set in Kansas City, Missouri